Podmoskovie Stadium, situated in the suburb of Shchelkovo some 15 km from the centre of Moscow, is one of the oldest stadia in Russia. The Russian word Podmoskovye means "Moscow Region".

Built in 1928, it underwent a refurbishment in 2003 to modernise its facilities.  As part of the preparations for the 2006 FIFA U-20 Women’s World Championship, the stadium received new seating areas, improved floodlighting and brought its VIP and press areas in line with international standards.

Sports venues completed in 1928
Sports venues built in the Soviet Union
Football venues in Russia
Sport in Moscow Oblast
Buildings and structures in Moscow Oblast
1928 establishments in the Soviet Union